Bukit Jalil is an affluent suburb in Kuala Lumpur, Malaysia. It is bounded by the National Sports Complex on the east, the Shah Alam Expressway on the north, city boundaries to the west, and the Puchong–Sungai Besi Highway as well as city boundaries to the south. It was known as the Bukit Jalil Estate until 1992, when the National Sports Complex was developed for the 1998 Commonwealth Games. The suburb was used as a filming location for the 1999 movie Entrapment, although the sign was changed to that of Pudu.

Transportation 

Bukit Jalil is strategically connected to other parts of Klang Valley via the Damansara–Puchong Expressway (LDP) and Puchong–Sungai Besi Highway. It is also accessible via the KESAS Highway, Maju Expressway, MEX Highway and New Pantai Expressway (NPE). It is served by the  Sri Petaling Line  Bukit Jalil LRT station and  Sri Petaling LRT station,  Awan Besar LRT station .

Education 

Bukit Jalil consists of several educational institutions such as International Medical University (IMU), Technology Park Malaysia (TPM), the Asia Pacific Institute of Information Technology and Asia Pacific University of Technology & Innovation(APU).

Residential 
There are many high-rise apartments and high-end condominiums situated around Bukit Jalil. 

Arena Green
Bukit OUG Condominium
Casa Green
Covillea Residence
Denai Sutera
Greenfields
Green Avenue
Impiana Sky
Jalil Damai
Kiara Residence 1&2
KM1 East and West
Lanai Residence
LTAT Apartments
Paraiso Residence
Parkhill Residence
PPA1M Bukit Jalil
Residensi Bukit Jalil
Residensi Bintang
Residensi Jalilmas 
Savanna Residence 1&2
Skyluxe Residence
The Como
The Havre
The Link 2
The Park Sky Residence (Pavilion)
The Park 2 (Pavilion)
The Rainz
The Treez
The Tropika 
Twin Arkz
Vista Commonwealth
Z Residence

Landed properties in Bukit Jalil are Alam Sutera, Bukit Jalil Golf & Country Resort, Esplanade, Jalil Sutera and Sri Jalil.

See also

 Sri Petaling LRT Station
 Bukit Jalil LRT Station
 Awan Besar LRT Station

References 

Suburbs in Kuala Lumpur